Guillermo García López was the defending champion, but lost to Lamine Ouahab in the second round.
Martin Kližan won the title, defeating Daniel Gimeno Traver in the final, 6–2, 6–2.

Seeds
The top four seeds receive a bye into the second round.

Draw

Finals

Top half

Bottom half

Qualifying

Seeds

Qualifiers

Qualifying draw

First qualifier

Second qualifier

Third qualifier

Fourth qualifier

References
 Main Draw
 Qualifying Draw

2015 ATP World Tour
Singles